Bare is a census town in Udma Grama Panchayat of Hosdurg taluk in Kasaragod district in Indian state of Kerala.

Demographics
As of 2011 Census, Bare (Mangad)census town had population of 12,804 which constitutes 5,970 males and 6,834 females. The sex ratio of Bare was 1145 higher than state average of 1084. Population of children in the age group 0-6 was 1,597 (12.5%) where 813 are males and 784 are females. Bare had an overall literacy of 88.4% lower than state average of 94%. The male literacy stands at 92.9% and female literacy was 84.6%.

Religions
As of 2011 Indian census, Bare census town had total population of 12,804 which constitutes 8,327 Hindus (65%), 4,461 Muslims (34.8%) and 0.12% others.

Administration
Bare is part of Udma (State Assembly constituency) under Kasaragod Loksabha.

References

Kanhangad area
 Cities and towns in Kasaragod district